Theodore G. Garfield (November 12, 1894 – November 4, 1989) served as a justice of the Iowa Supreme Court longer than all but one other justice. A member of the Court from January 1, 1941, until his retirement on November 11, 1969, he served as Iowa's Chief Justice in rotation for four years, and then on a continuing basis from 1961 to 1969.

Born in Humboldt, Iowa to George S. and Mary (White) Garfield, he received a Bachelor of Arts degree from the University of Iowa in 1915 and his law degree from the University of Iowa College of Law in 1917. Immediately thereafter, he volunteered for military service in the United States Army, He was on a tour of duty as a lieutenant teaching artillery fire at Fort Sill, Oklahoma, at the time the armistice ended World War I in 1918.  He entered the private practice of law at Ames, Iowa, as the junior partner of Lee & Garfield.

In 1926, he was elected as a Republican as a trial-court judge for Iowa's Eleventh Judicial District.  He served in this position from January 1927 until his elevation to the Supreme Court. After mandatory retirement from the court, he returned to the practice of law at Ames. Soon after his retirement, he agreed to serve as a hearing officer for University of Iowa students and groups subjected to discipline as part of antiwar activities.

Garfield's 28-year-tenure on thee Iowa Supreme Court was not exceeded until 2006 by Justice Jerry L. Larson, who retired soon thereafter.

References

United States Army personnel of World War I
Iowa lawyers
University of Iowa alumni
University of Iowa College of Law alumni
Justices of the Iowa Supreme Court
Iowa state court judges
1894 births
1989 deaths
People from Humboldt, Iowa
20th-century American judges
Chief Justices of the Iowa Supreme Court
20th-century American lawyers